The posterior talofibular ligament is a ligament that connects the fibula to the talus bone. It runs almost horizontally from the malleolar fossa of the lateral malleolus of the fibula to the lateral tubercle on the posterior surface of the talus. This insertion lies immediately lateral to the groove for the tendon of the flexor hallucis longus.

References

External links
 

Ligaments of the lower limb